IIMT University is a private university situated in Meerut, West U.P. (Uttar Pradesh), North India.

Schools/Colleges

 School of Pharmaceutical Sciences, IIMT University
 School of Life Science and Technology, IIMT University
 School of Journalism & Mass Communication, IIMT University
 School of Hotel Management, Catering & Tourism, IIMT University
 School of Engineering & Technology, IIMT University
 School of Computer Science & Applications, IIMT University
 School of Commerce & Management, IIMT University
 School of Basic Sciences and Technology, IIMT University
 School Of Arts and Humanities, IIMT University
 School Of Agriculture Science, IIMT University
 IIMT College of Medical Sciences
 IIMT College & Hospital of Naturopathy & Yogic Sciences
 IIMT Ayurvedic Medical College and Hospital
 College of Law, IIMT University
 College of Education, IIMT University

References

External links
Official Website 

Universities and colleges in Meerut
Private universities in Uttar Pradesh
Educational institutions established in 2016
2016 establishments in Uttar Pradesh